Tracy Keith Hayworth (born December 18, 1967) is a former American football linebacker in the National Football League. He was drafted by the Detroit Lions in the seventh round of the 1990 NFL Draft with the 174th overall pick. He played college football at Tennessee. He played high school for the Franklin County High School Rebels, as a running back, class of 1985.
On July 20, 2018, Hayworth was introduced as head football coach at Grundy County High in Coalmont, Tenn.

References 

1967 births
Living people
People from Winchester, Tennessee
Players of American football from Tennessee
American football linebackers
Tennessee Volunteers football players
Detroit Lions players